Shri Vaishnav Vidyapeeth Vishwavidyalaya  is a private university in Indore, Madhya Pradesh, India. It was established in 2015.Shri Vaishnav Vidyapeeth Vishwavidyalaya at Indore is a multi-disciplinary university focusing on the needs of various segments of the society.

References

External links

Private universities in India
Educational institutions established in 2015
2015 establishments in Madhya Pradesh